Love Is Only In The Movies is the 5th installment of the Precious Hearts Romances Presents series. The series stars Zanjoe Marudo and Mariel Rodriguez. The series is based on the novel written by Filipino romance author, Heart Yngrid.

Plot
The story of Sheye (Mariel Rodriguez), a certified movie fanatic who spent her younger years with her grandmother re-enacting famous movie scenes together. Due to unexpected circumstances, she grew up using her acting skills not to pursue a showbiz career but to become a professional impostor, fabrication specialist and a reality actress rolled into one. In one of her projects, she met Xander (Zanjoe Marudo), a certified playboy who does not believe in love.

Synopsis
The series begins with Sheye and her grandparents, which then her grandfather dies. In the latter, it shows that Sheye works as an extra for films and lives with her grandma, she also has a part-time job that is... an impostor. Her next job is to act as a prostitute and to get Xander, a director and playboy, and bring him back to his ex-girlfriend who instructs to leave Xander in the motel room and then Sheye's job unfortunately she doesn't show up, leaving Xander alone thinking Sheye has escaped stealing all his money. Sheye now has the money, her grandma is rushed to the hospital and needs to go under surgery, Sheye thinks to use the money. She then has another customer, the customer asks her to act as the lost daughter of her brother who has diabetes so that he can be well. Sheye then does her job, knowing Xander is the son of the customer, they encounter each other, Xander thinking that Sheye is an impostor and that no one can be sure if she is really his cousin, he then falls in love with Sheye so does Shey fall in love with him. Sheye's grandma visits Sheye in their customer's house seeing the customer's brother and confronts him that why did he abandon his daughter which turns out true, the series end Sheye and Xander discover that they are not blood-related.

Cast

Main cast
Zanjoe Marudo as Xander
Mariel Rodriguez as Sheye

Supporting cast
Wendy Valdez as Queenie
Drei Felix as Dom
Mico Palanca as Dennis
Kristel Moreno as Liz
Regine Angeles as Raya
Flora Gasser as Lola Senda
Jong Cuenco as Manuel
Timmy Cruz as Alejandra

Special participation
Noemi Oneiza as young Shiogan
Bugoy Cariño as young Xander 
Randolf Stamatelaky as Roy
Auriette Divina as Alice

See also
List of programs aired by ABS-CBN
List of dramas of ABS-CBN
Precious Hearts Romances Presents

References

External links
 Love Is Only In The Movies on ABS-CBN

ABS-CBN drama series
2010 Philippine television series debuts
2010 Philippine television series endings
Philippine romantic comedy television series
Television shows based on books
Filipino-language television shows
Television shows set in the Philippines